is a Japanese idol, singer, songwriter, actor, and television personality. Along with Koichi Domoto (with whom he has no blood-relation), he is a member of KinKi Kids, which is a Japanese duo under the management of Johnny & Associates and the record holder of Guinness World Records for having the record of the most consecutive number-one singles since their debut single.

Biography 

Born in Nara, Domoto joined Johnny's Entertainment on May 5, 1991, which also the first time he met his future bandmate Koichi Domoto. The opportunity came while without his knowing, his mother and his 6-years-older sister sent his resume to the office. Domoto and his bandmate Koichi Domoto first worked together as backdancers for Hikaru Genji, who were holding a concert at Yokohama Arena, and has since then been partnered up for magazine photoshoots, music acts and drama projects. The duo starred in their first drama together called Ningen Shikkaku in 1994, in which Domoto was awarded Best Newcomer in the Television Drama Academy Awards.

With Koichi Domoto, he eventually made his debut in 1997 as KinKi Kids with a double release of a single "Garasu no Shōnen" and an album A Album, both of which went on to sell more than a million copies.

On May 29, 2002, Domoto released his first solo single, "Machi/Dekiai Logic", in which he penned and composed all the tracks. The single was used as the theme song for Domoto's lead-role drama Yume no California and it reached number 1 in the weekly chart. In the following month, Domoto started his career as an illustrator by publishing a book in collaboration with writer Shizuka Iziyuuin. They collaborated again for another book in 2003.

Domoto appeared in the 2003 drama Moto Kare, in which he co-starred for the second time with Ryōko Hirosue after their hit drama Summer Snow in 2000. In April 2004, Domoto once again provided the theme song for his lead-role drama Home Drama. This year, he won the 'Best Jeanist' award. The following year, Domoto acted in a movie, Fantastipo, with fellow Johnny's personality Taichi Kokubun. He paired with Toraji Haiji to release the theme song for the movie. The same year, Domoto starred in Hoshi ni Negai o (a.k.a. Wish Upon A Star), a TV drama produced by Disney and Fuji TV based on the true story of planetarium engineer Takayuki Ohira who designed Megastar II – the world's most advanced planetarium projector.

In 2006, Domoto put his acting career on hold and focused more on his music career. He began to release his solo work under the project name Endlicheri-Endlicheri. During his Endlicheri-Endlicheri era, Domoto released three singles which all topped the weekly charts and made him the second male soloist after Masahiko Kondo to have achieved five consecutive number one singles. He then renamed his solo project 244 Endli-x (pronounced "Tsuyoshi Endorikkusu") in 2008. He announced that he would go on his first concert tour as 244 Endli-x soon after, which began on March 29, 2008 at the Yokohama Arena and ended in Sendai on May 8, 2008. At the end of April, Domoto was appointed to be the first special ambassador for Nara tourism.

In the same year, he released another single, "Rain", on September 9, which topped the Oricon Single Weekly Charts. Domoto also announced his collaboration with the hat brand CA4LA. Known as the fashion leader with unique style, Domoto was chosen by famous sports brand Adidas Originals to be the image character for its new campaign BE Originals which start on February 12, 2010.

On April 6, 2011, Domoto released his ninth single, "Eni o Yuite", which was recorded at shrines believed to have connections to Nara's entertainment and music industries. Another single, "Niji no Uta", was released in September 2011.

On June 28, 2017 it was revealed that Domoto would be hospitalized for one week after experiencing sudden deafness, otherwise known as sudden sensorineural hearing loss. Due to this, he was unable to attend TV Tokyo’s “Ongakusai 2017” broadcast on the same date with fellow bandmate Koichi. He was released the following week and was instructed to continue outpatient recovery. He returned to the stage after a 4 month hiatus, participating in the music festival "TV Asahi Dream Festival 2017" with Koichi on the 29th of October.

Domoto, once again changing his name to Endrecheri, released a new full length studio album titled "Naralien" on August 14, 2019. The album featured lead track "4 10 cake (Hot Cake) and brand new songs “FUNK TRON”, “Heki”, and “PURPLE FIRE”. Remakes of his older songs “Believe in intuition…” & “NIPPON” were also included. The album was released in three versions. Limited Edition A included a DVD containing the music video for the Album's lead track “4 10 cake (Hot cake)” and footage from ENDRECHERI’s performance at SUMMER SONIC 2018, while the Limited Edition B is packaged with a second DVD which includes an hour-long video centering around Tsuyoshi and his band members. The album charted #1 on the Oricon weekly Albums chart.

In the video for the album's lead track "4 10 cake (Hot Cake)" Domoto is seen singing and dancing with various different dancers including Japanese Choreographer Riehata.

Discography

Filmography

Film

Television 
 As an actor

 As a personality

Japanese dub

Books 
 2002: Kimi to arukeba (Story by: Shizuka Iziyuuin, Illustration by: Domoto Tsuyoshi, Published by: Asahi Shimbun)
 2003: Zuutto isshou. (Story by: Shizuka Iziyuuin, Illustration by: Domoto Tsuyoshi, Published by: Asahi Shimbun)
 2005: Boku no Kutsu oto (Compilation of Domoto Tsuyoshi writing that serialize in Myojo from 1999 to 2005, Published by: Shueisha)
 2006: Shoujiki I LOVE YOU (First Solo Photo-book, Published by: Tokyo Shimbun)
 2009: Domoto Tsuyoshi to Atama no Naka (FINEBOYS Special Fashion Book, Published by: Hinode Publishing)
 2010: Berlin (Published by: Shogakukan)
 2014: Kokoro no Hanashi (Published by: KADOKAWA)

Concerts

Awards 
 1994: 2nd Television Drama Academy Awards (Summer): Best Newcomer for Ningen Shikkaku
 1998: 2nd Nikkan Sports Drama Grand Prix (98–99): Best Actor for Ao no Jidai
 1999: 22nd Television Drama Academy Awards (Summer): Best Actor for To Heart Koishite Shinitai
 2000: 26th Television Drama Academy Awards (Summer): Best Actor for Summer Snow
 2004: Best Jeanist of the Year

References

External links 
  
 Instagram
 Twitter
 

1979 births
Living people
Funk musicians
Gan-Shin artists
Musicians from Nara Prefecture
People from Nara, Nara
Johnny & Associates
Japanese male pop singers
Japanese male rock singers
Japanese male actors
Japanese male singer-songwriters
Japanese singer-songwriters
Japanese television personalities
21st-century Japanese singers
21st-century Japanese male singers
Horikoshi High School alumni